Tris(dimethylamino)gallium dimer, formally bis(μ-dimethylamino)tetrakis(dimethylamino)digallium, is an amide complex of gallium. This compound may be used as a precursor to other gallium complexes.

Commercially available, this compound may be prepared from lithium dimethylamide and gallium trichloride.

References

Gallium compounds
Metal amides